Pashaly Treti (also, Pashaly Tret’i, Orta Pashaly, and Pashaly Tretiy) is a village in the Hajigabul Rayon of Azerbaijan.

References 

Populated places in Hajigabul District